The Anna Blaman Prijs (Dutch for Anna Blaman Prize) is a Dutch literary award created by the Prins Bernhard Cultuurfonds. The award is named after Dutch writer and poet Anna Blaman. The award is only given to those who either live or work or have a close connection with the city of Rotterdam. The award is given once every three years.

The award was established in 1965 and first awarded in 1966. Early on, the award was given for a specific work but as of 1981 the award is given for someone's entire oeuvre. , the award is organised by the Passionate Bulkboek organisation.

, the Anna Blaman Prijs and the Hendrik Chabot Prijs (for visual arts) are the two remaining awards for the Rotterdam area created by the Prins Bernhard Cultuurfonds. , the Elly Ameling Prijs (for music) is no longer awarded and the Prins Bernhard Cultuurfonds only awards Cultuurprijs Zuid-Holland every other year. The Hendrik Chabot Prijs is now organised and awarded by the Chabot Museum.

Winners 
 1966 - Adriaan van der Veen, Een idealist
 1967 - Willem Adriaan Wagener
 1968 - Bob den Uyl, Een zachte fluittoon
 1969 - Leyn Leijnse, Afrika sterft in den vreemde
 1971 - Herman Romer, Voor de liefhebbers
 1974 - Jacobus P. Bos, De dagelijkse geest
 1981 - Cornelis Bastiaan Vaandrager
 1988 - Jules Deelder
 1990 - Frank Koenegracht
 1992 - J.W. Oerlemans
 1994 - Jan Eijkelboom
 1996 - Marcel Möring
 1998 - Theo Verhaar
 2001 - Hester Knibbe
 2004 - Anne Vegter
 2007 - Rien Vroegindeweij
 2010 - Ester Naomi Perquin
 2013 - Sanneke van Hassel
 2016 - Hans Sleutelaar
 2019 - Edward van de Vendel
 2022 - Raoul de Jong

References

External links 
 Official website (in Dutch)
 Anna Blaman Prijs (in Dutch) dutchheights.nl

Dutch literary awards
1965 establishments in the Netherlands
Awards established in 1965